The Graue Mill is a water-powered grist mill that was originally erected in 1852.  Now a museum, it is one of two operating water-powered gristmills in Illinois (the other is the Franklin Creek Grist Mill).  It is located on Salt Creek in Oak Brook, Illinois, owned by the Forest Preserve District of DuPage County and operated by a nonprofit preservationist group.

History
Friedrich Graue, born in Germany, emigrated to the United States in the late 1840s.  Changing his name to 'Frederick', he brought with him knowledge of the craft of waterwheel gristmilling.  Settling in what was the farming village and early transportation hub of Fullersburg, Illinois, formerly named Brush Hill, he and William Asche (whose brother-in-law, Henry Fischer, built a wind-powered grist mill in what is now Mount Emblem Cemetery) filed claim in 1849 to a tract of damp, clay-rich bottomland along the banks of Salt Creek that was home to a sawmill that burned down the year before.  Together they built a new sawmill.  They together operated this mill for three years, until Graue decided to engage in the milling business on his own.

Digging ditches in the poorly drained soil, he and his family recovered clay that could be used to make bricks.  The Graues built a kiln on their farmstead, fired the bricks, and slowly raised the new structure and waterwheel into place from the on-site building materials.  The mill went into operation in the summer of 1852.

The ditching and draining of the Graue Mill farmstead was typical of German-American settlement patterns in the Midwest in the 1840s and 1850s, as the thrifty German emigrants found assets in tracts of land that had been left behind by earlier, English-speaking frontiersmen and women.

Graue could not build his entire mill from onsite materials.  He bought four buhrstones that turned on water-driven axles to grind locally grown corn and wheat.  Quarried in France, the buhrstones, a type of millstone, were carefully dressed by specially trained craftsmen so as to form two level, gritty surfaces that would pulverize the grain between them.

Graue and his family were Pietist Germans who opposed American slavery.  The mill is one of three authenticated Illinois stops on the Underground Railroad, the subversive movement that helped fugitive slaves escape from the American South to Canada.

Today

The Graue Mill operated in eastern DuPage County under three generations of the Graue family for approximately 60 years.  In the 1910s, advances in milling technology, particularly the invention of steel rolling mills, drove the old mill out of business.  The derelict mill was restored by the Civilian Conservation Corps in 1934–1943, and was opened to the public as a working historic site in 1951.

As DuPage County became urbanized in the second half of the 20th century, the mill's surroundings lost their agricultural context.  The mill building itself, however, was honored as a survivor from Illinois post-frontier years.  The Graue Mill was listed on the National Register of Historic Places in 1975, and was recognized as a Historic Mechanical Engineering Landmark in 1981.  The mill has been periodically re-restored since 1943 to keep it in operating condition, including work completed in 2002.

The Graue Mill is located at 3800 S. York Road, on the banks of Salt Creek in Oak Brook, Illinois, and is surrounded by Fullersburg woods.  It is currently open to the public and as of 2017 grinds grain which can be purchased at the site.  Check the Graue Mill and Museum website for dates and times of operation.

References

External links

 Graue Mill and Museum, Forest Preserve District of DuPage County
 Fullersburg Woods Nature Education Center
 Fullersburg Historic District, Fullersburg Historic Foundation
 Hinsdale Chamber of Commerce
 Oak Brook Historic Timeline
 "Chapter 11: Hinsdale" by Shirley Stitt in DuPage Roots by editors, Stephen A. Thompson and Contributors 
 "Chapter 16: Oak Brook" by Etta Susan Chapek in DuPage Roots by editors, Stephen A. Thompson and Contributors 

1852 establishments in Illinois
Civilian Conservation Corps in Illinois
Grinding mills in Illinois
Hinsdale, Illinois
Historic Mechanical Engineering Landmarks
Industry museums in Illinois
Mill museums in the United States
Museums in DuPage County, Illinois
National Register of Historic Places in DuPage County, Illinois
Oak Brook, Illinois
Underground Railroad locations
Underground Railroad in Illinois
Grinding mills on the National Register of Historic Places in Illinois